Poo Bear Presents Bearthday Music, also titled Bearthday Music, is the debut studio album by American record producer Poo Bear. Featuring collaborators such as Justin Bieber, Zara Larsson, Jennifer Lopez and Anitta, it was released on April 27, 2018.

Consisting of 15 songs, the album includes the lead single "Hard 2 Face Reality" which is a collaboration with pop singer Justin Bieber and hip hop artist Jay Electronica. "Will I See You" featuring Anitta was previously released as the bilingual first single in September 2017. The album's pre-sale began on April 6, 2018.

Track listing
Credits adapted from Tidal.

References

2018 debut albums
Capitol Records albums
Albums produced by Poo Bear